Neal X (born Neal Whitmore) is the former guitarist with the British band Sigue Sigue Sputnik. They had a No. 3 UK hit single with "Love Missile F1-11" in 1986. He has also worked as a sideman for Adam Ant and Marc Almond. Whitmore founded the Montecristos who released their debut album Born to Rock 'N' Roll in 2015. He is a member of the band The Loveless, alongside Marc Almond, Iggy Pop's rhythm section Ben Ellis and Mat Hector, and James Beaumont.

References

External links
 
 

Living people
People from Henley-on-Thames
English rock guitarists
English male guitarists
English new wave musicians
Glam punk musicians
Sigue Sigue Sputnik members
Year of birth missing (living people)